Punky Brewster is an American sitcom television series that premiered on Peacock on February 25, 2021. It is a revival to the 1984–1988 series of the same name, and stars Soleil Moon Frye and Cherie Johnson, with Quinn Copeland, Noah Cottrell, Oliver De Los Santos, Lauren Lindsey Donzis and Freddie Prinze Jr. In August 2021, the series was canceled after one season.

Premise 
Punky Brewster is now a divorced mother raising three children: her teenage biological daughter Hannah, and her two adopted sons, Diego and Daniel. She lives in the same Chicago apartment where she grew up with her foster father, Henry Warnimont, and even works as a photographer, just like he did. She encounters a girl at Fenster Hall named Izzy, who, like Punky, was abandoned by her mother. Punky is still best friends with Cherie, who works at Fenster and arranges to have Izzy live with a foster family, but after seeing the similarities in Izzy compared to when she was her age, Punky decides to take her in and raise her with her three children. Punky also has an on-off relationship with her ex-husband Travis and discovers that the mother who abandoned her in the grocery store as a child is still alive and has been looking for her for years.

Cast

Main 
Soleil Moon Frye as Penelope "Punky" Brewster
Cherie Johnson as Cherie Johnson
Quinn Copeland as Izzy
Noah Cottrell as Diego
Oliver De Los Santos as Daniel
Lauren Lindsey Donzis as Hannah
Freddie Prinze Jr. as Travis

Guest stars 
Seth Green as Evan (episode: "Two First Dates")
Ami Foster as Margaux Kramer (episode: "The Look of Daniel")
Alexa Bliss and Charlotte Flair (WWE) as themselves (episode: "The Look of Daniel")
Sharon Lawrence as Susan (3 episodes)

Production
A Punky Brewster revival series was reported to be in development in June 2019. In September of that year, it was reported the series, along with the Saved by the Bell revival, would appear on the Peacock streaming service. A 10-episode first season was greenlit by Peacock in January 2020. On August 19, 2021, Peacock canceled the series after one season.

Episodes

Reception

Review aggregator Rotten Tomatoes reported an approval rating of 57% based on 14 reviews, with an average rating of 5.90/10. The website's critical consensus reads, "It's delightful to see Soleil Moon Frye again, but with dated plotting and a lack of focus, Punky Brewster can't quite fill her multicolored Cons."

References

External links
 

2021 American television series debuts
2021 American television series endings
2020s American sitcoms
American sequel television series
English-language television shows
Peacock (streaming service) original programming
Television series by Universal Content Productions
Television series by Universal Television
Television shows set in Chicago
Television series about families
Children's and Family Emmy Award winners